Berlin is an extinct town in Johnson Township, Clinton County, Indiana in the United States.  Platted in 1847 on Indian Prairie near the southeast corner of the township, the town faded during the 19th century and by the early 1900s was "off the map".

References

Former populated places in Clinton County, Indiana
Former populated places in Indiana